Spartak - Ukraine is a physical culture and sports association of Ukraine. It was revived in Zhytomyr in January 1992. Established in 1936 as the All-Union volunteer sports society, Spartak - Ukraine traces its history back to 1923 when it was known as the Komsomol sports society Spartak.

History
At the end of eighties (1987) the former sports associations of trade unions "Avanhard", "Burevestnik", "Vodnik", "Zenit", "Kolos", "Lokomotiv", and "Spartak" were united into the All-Union volunteer physical culture and sports association of trade unions (VDFSTP). After several years "Kolos" has separated from it and in 1991 VDFSTP was reorganized into the sports association of trade unions "Ukraine".

External links
 Official website
 Spartak at Ukrainian Soviet Encyclopedia
 List of Olympic centers
 Strashevych, V. FST "Spartak" - 75 years!. "Olimpiyska Arena". 2010.
 

1923 establishments in Ukraine
Sports societies in the Ukrainian Soviet Socialist Republic
Sports clubs established in 1923
Sport societies in Ukraine